White Settlement Independent School District is a public school district based in White Settlement, Texas (USA). The district serves students in White Settlement and a portion of Fort Worth in west central Tarrant County.

In 2009, the school district was rated "academically acceptable" by the Texas Education Agency.

Schools
Brewer High School 
Brewer Middle School
Tannahill Intermediate School (Fort Worth)
Blue Haze Elementary School (Fort Worth)
Liberty Elementary School
North Elementary School (Fort Worth)
West Elementary School
Fine Arts Academy
Mesa High School/Disciplinary Alternative Education Program (DAEP)

Students

Academics

Students in White Settlement typically perform close to local region and statewide averages on standardized tests.  In 2015-2016 State of Texas Assessments of Academic Readiness (STAAR) results, 78% of students in White Settlement ISD met Level II Satisfactory standards, compared with 77% in Region 11 and 75% in the state of Texas. The average SAT score of the class of 2015 was 1360, and the average ACT score was 20.1.

Demographics
In the 2015-2016 school year, the school district had a total of 6,697 students, ranging from early childhood education and pre-kindergarten through grade 12. The class of 2015 included 397 graduates; the annual drop-out rate across grades 9-12 was 1.8%.

As of the 2015-2016 school year, the ethnic distribution of the school district was 49.5% White, 37.2% Hispanic, 7.1% African American, 1.5% Asian, 0.5% American Indian, 0.3% Pacific Islander, and 3.9% from two or more races. Economically disadvantaged students made up 53.8% of the student body.

References

External links

White Settlement ISD

School districts in Tarrant County, Texas
School districts in Fort Worth, Texas